Harold Mead Stark (born August 6, 1939 in Los Angeles, California)
is an American mathematician, specializing in number theory. He is best known for his solution of the Gauss class number 1 problem, in effect correcting and completing the earlier work of Kurt Heegner, and for Stark's conjecture. More recently, he collaborated with Audrey Terras to study zeta functions in graph theory. He is currently on the faculty of the University of California, San Diego.

Stark received his bachelor's degree from California Institute of Technology in 1961 and his PhD from the University of California, Berkeley in 1964. He was on the faculty at the University of Michigan from 1964 to 1968, at the Massachusetts Institute of Technology from 1968 to 1980, and at the University of California, San Diego from 1980 to the present.

Stark was elected to the American Academy of Arts and Sciences in 1983 and to the United States National Academy of Sciences in 2007. In 2012, he became a fellow of the American Mathematical Society.

Selected publications
 ;

See also
Brumer–Stark conjecture

Notes

External links 
 
 Stark's home page at UCSD

1939 births
20th-century American mathematicians
21st-century American mathematicians
Living people
Number theorists
University of California, Berkeley alumni
University of Michigan faculty
Massachusetts Institute of Technology faculty
University of California, San Diego faculty
Members of the United States National Academy of Sciences
Fellows of the American Academy of Arts and Sciences
Fellows of the American Mathematical Society